Daniel Rossello Sambaino (born February 20, 1972 in Montevideo, Uruguay), known as Daniel Rossello, is a Uruguayan football manager and former player.

External links
 

1972 births
Living people
Footballers from Montevideo
Uruguayan footballers
Liga MX players

Association football forwards
Uruguayan football managers
21st-century Uruguayan people